Guy Defraigne (born 24 January 1958) is a Belgian rower. He competed at the 1972 Summer Olympics and the 1984 Summer Olympics.

References

1958 births
Living people
Belgian male rowers
Olympic rowers of Belgium
Rowers at the 1972 Summer Olympics
Rowers at the 1984 Summer Olympics
Royal Club Nautique de Gand rowers